In the House is an American sitcom starring LL Cool J, Debbie Allen, Maia Campbell, Jeffery Wood, Alfonso Ribeiro and Kim Wayans. The series aired for two seasons on NBC from April 1995 to May 1996 after which it was canceled due to low ratings. UPN quickly picked up In the House where it aired for an additional two seasons. UPN canceled the series in May 1998. The series ran in first-run syndication for a fifth and final season, which ended on August 11, 1999.

Synopsis

Marion Hill (LL Cool J) is a former professional football player. Because of his financial predicament, Marion is forced to rent out most of the rooms in his house to newly divorced single mother Jackie Warren (Debbie Allen) and her two children, Tiffany (Maia Campbell) and Austin (Jeffery Wood).

After the second season, the series was retooled, becoming more adult-oriented. Jackie and Austin both moved back East while Tiffany stayed with Marion to finish high school. Joining the cast for the third season was former Fresh Prince of Bel-Air star Alfonso Ribeiro as Dr. Maxwell "Max" Stanton and In Living Color cast member Kim Wayans as Tonia Harris. Both Maxwell and Tonia helped Marion manage the Los Angeles sports clinic he owns, then Tonia leaves for the WNBA after Season 4, and Tiffany leaves after only two episodes in Season 5.

Cast

Main
LL Cool J as Marion Hill
Maia Campbell as Tiffany Warren
Debbie Allen as Jackie Warren (seasons 1–2)
Jeffery Wood as Austin Warren (seasons 1–2)
Kim Wayans as Tonia Harris (seasons 2–4)
Alfonso Ribeiro as Dr. Maxwell Stanton (seasons 3–5)
Dee Jay Daniels as Rodney (season 3, episodes 1–7)

Recurring
Lisa Arrindell Anderson as Heather Comstock (seasons 1–2)
Ken Lawson as Carl (season 3–5)
 Paulette Braxton as Natalie Davis (season 4) 
 Gabrielle Carmouche as Raynelle (season 3–5)
Luis Antonio Ramos as Tito Barrientos (season 4)
Lark Voorhies as Mercedes Langford (seasons 4–5)
Kenya Moore as Valerie Bridgeforth (season 5)
John Amos as Coach Sam Wilson (season 1–3)
Chris Browning as Clayton (season 2)
Richard F. Whiten as Henry (season 3)
Mel Jackson as Graham (season 4)
Michael Warren as (season 1–2)
Mari Morrow as Amber (season 3)
Derek McGrath as Bernie/Agent Dick Kelly (season 4)
Phil Morris as Goldwire (season 4)
Eric Howell Sharp as Benny (season 3)
Dawn McMillan as Sasha (season 1–2)
Chaz Lamar Shepherd as Mark (season 4)
Joan Pringle as Patricia Hill (season 4-5)

U.S. television ratings

Awards and nominations

Syndication
The show aired in off-network syndication during the 1999–2000 season, the series had reran weeknights at 7pm EST on New York City's local UPN affiliation WWOR-TV until it was replaced by The Jamie Foxx Show reruns in fall 2000, and on TV One from 2004–2008. On June 13, 2016, BET aired reruns of the show in the earlier months on the weekdays in random times from 2:30AM to 4:00AM on Fridays until the week of August 29 to September 2, 2016. The series also aired reruns on BET Her. 
Aspire will begin airing reruns of the show on August 1, 2020.

On November 1, 2021, In the House began streaming on HBO Max.

References

External links
  
 

1990s American black sitcoms
1990s American sitcoms
1995 American television series debuts
1999 American television series endings
English-language television shows
NBC original programming
Oakland Raiders
Television shows set in Los Angeles
Television series by Universal Television
Television series by Warner Bros. Television Studios
UPN original programming
American television series revived after cancellation